Elaphe davidi is a species of snake in the family Colubridae. The species is endemic to East Asia.

Etymology
The specific name, davidi, is in honor of Armand David, who was a French zoologist and priest.

Geographic range
E. davidi is found in China and North Korea.

Reproduction
E. davidi is oviparous.

References

Further reading
Boulenger GA (1894). Catalogue of the Snakes in the British Museum (Natural History). Volume II., Containing the Conclusion of the Colubridæ Aglyphæ. London: Trustees of the British Museum (Natural History). (Taylor and Francis, printers). xi + 382 pp. + Plates I-XX. (Coluber davidi, p. 56).
Pope CH (1935). The Reptiles of China: Turtles, Crocodilians, Snakes, Lizards. (Volume X of the Natural History of Central Asia series, edited by Chester A. Reeds). New York: American Museum of Natural History. lii + 604 pp., 28 figures, Plates I-XXVII. (Elaphe davidi, pp. 238–240, Figure 52).
Sauvage H-E (1884). "Sur quelques Reptiles de la collection du Muséum d'histoire naturelle". Bulletin de la Société Philomathique de Paris, Septième Série [Seventh Series] 18 : 142–147. (Tropidonotus davidi, new species, p. 144). (in French).

Taxa named by Henri Émile Sauvage
Reptiles described in 1884
Reptiles of China
Reptiles of Korea
Elaphe